Walker Cottage is a historic cure cottage located at Saranac Lake in the town of Harrietstown, Franklin County, New York.  It was built in 1904 and is a -story, rectangular wood-frame dwelling with front and rear additions.  It features a total of eight cure porches.   An open verandah across the front facade with three sleeping porches above.  A small gabled portico extends out from the front of the verandah.

It was listed on the National Register of Historic Places in 1992.

References

Houses on the National Register of Historic Places in New York (state)
Colonial Revival architecture in New York (state)
Houses completed in 1904
Houses in Franklin County, New York
National Register of Historic Places in Franklin County, New York